

The Letov Š-6 was a bomber aircraft produced in Czechoslovakia during the 1920s. Derived from the Š-2, it was a biplane of conventional design. The wing cellule was an all-new design with a thicker profile, and while it had been intended to build them with a metal structure, wood was used instead due to shortages. Performance during testing was so promising that in 1924 an Š-6 was used to set a new altitude record with a 500 kg payload, and (on another occasion) a national endurance record of 10 h 32 min.

The Š-6 enjoyed a long career in Czechoslovakian service, remaining in use until 1934. One example was given a civil registration (L-BORA) and evaluated as an airliner for the Prague-Gothenburg route, but nothing came of this.

Specifications

See also

References

Further reading

External links 

  Letov Š-6

1920s Czechoslovakian bomber aircraft
Letov aircraft
Biplanes
Single-engined tractor aircraft
Aircraft first flown in 1923